Uncial 0304 (in the Gregory-Aland numbering), is a Greek uncial manuscript of the New Testament. Palaeographically it has been assigned to the 9th century.

Description 
The codex contains a small texts of the Acts 6:5-7.13, on 1 parchment leaf (24 cm by 17 cm). The leaf has survived in a fragmentary condition. It is written in two columns per page, 31 lines per page, in uncial letters. 

Currently it is dated by the INTF to the 9th century.

It is currently housed at the Bibliothèque nationale de France (Gr. 1126 VII, fol. 160) in Paris.

See also 

 List of New Testament uncials
 Biblical manuscripts
 Textual criticism

References

External links 

 Henri Omont, Inventaire sommaire des manuscrits grecs de la Bibliothèque nationale et des autres bibliothèques de Paris et des Départements, Paris 1886, p. 225.

Greek New Testament uncials
9th-century biblical manuscripts
Bibliothèque nationale de France collections